Schizobrachiella is a genus of bryozoans belonging to the family Schizoporellidae.

The species of this genus are found in Europe, Australia, North America.

Species:

Schizobrachiella alata 
Schizobrachiella andegavensis 
Schizobrachiella arawakensis 
Schizobrachiella candida 
Schizobrachiella convergens 
Schizobrachiella granosoporosa 
Schizobrachiella hexagonalis 
Schizobrachiella porosa 
Schizobrachiella sanguinea 
Schizobrachiella stylifera 
Schizobrachiella verrilli

References

Bryozoan genera